Weatherby may refer to:

 Weatherby, American gun manufacturer
 Roy Weatherby, American gunsmith, founder of the company

Places
 Weatherby, Missouri, a village in DeKalb County, Missouri, United States
 Weatherby Lake, Missouri, a city in Platte County Missouri, United States
 Weatherby, Oregon, an unincorporated community in Baker County, Oregon, United States

People
 Charles Alfred Weatherby (1875–1949), American botanist
 Dennis Weatherby (1959–2007), American inventor, scientist, university administrator
 Sir Francis Weatherby (1885–1969), English cricketer, soldier and horse racing official
 John Weatherby (1870–1948), English cricketer
 Meredith Weatherby (c.1914–1997), American publisher
 Weatherby, a character of Dead or Alive, only appearing in DOA: Dead or Alive, voiced by Steve Howey
 Weatherby Swann, fictional governor of Port Royal in Disney's Pirates of the Caribbean movies
 Weatherby, the name Barty Crouch Sr. constantly calls Percy Weasley in the Harry Potter series, because he always forgets that his last name is "Weasley"

See also
 Mr. Weatherbee, Wendy Weatherbee, and Tony Weatherbee; characters in Archie Comics
 Wetherby, a town in West Yorkshire, England
 Wetherby (film)
 Weatherbys central administration for British horseracing
 Weathersby, a surname